Bach flower remedies (BFRs) are solutions of brandy and water—the water containing extreme dilutions of flower material developed by Edward Bach, an English homeopath, in the 1930s. Bach claimed that the dew found on flower petals retains the supposed healing properties of that plant. Systematic reviews of clinical trials of Bach flower solutions have found no efficacy beyond that of a placebo.

Description
The Bach flower remedy solutions, which contain a 50:50 mix of water and brandy, are called mother tincture. Stock remedies—the solutions sold in shops—are dilutions of mother tincture into other liquid. Most often the liquid used is alcohol, so that the alcohol level by volume in most stock Bach remedies is between 25 and 40% (50 to 80 proof). The solutions do not have a characteristic scent or taste of the plant because of dilution. The dilution process results in the statistical likelihood that little more than a single molecule may remain; it is claimed that the remedies contain "energetic" or "vibrational" nature of the flower and that this can be transmitted to the user. The solutions are described by some as vibrational medicines, which implies they rely on the pseudoscientific concept of water memory. They are often labeled as homeopathic because they are extremely diluted in water, but are not homeopathy as they do not follow other homeopathic ideas such as the law of similars.

Effectiveness 
In a 2002 database review of randomized trials Edzard Ernst concluded:

All randomized double-blind studies, whether finding for or against the solutions, have suffered from small cohort sizes but the studies using the best methods found no effect over placebo. The most likely means of action for flower remedies is as placebos, enhanced by introspection on the patient's emotional state, or simply being listened to by the practitioner. The act of selecting and taking a remedy may act as a calming ritual.

A systematic review in 2009 concluded:

A newer systematic review published in 2010 by Ernst concluded: 

Flower remedies are sometimes promoted as being capable of boosting the immune system, but "there is no scientific evidence to prove that flower remedies can control, cure or prevent any type of disease, including cancer".

Use
Each solution is used alone or in conjunction with other solutions, and each flower is said by advocates to impart specific qualities. Remedies are usually taken orally.

The solutions may be recommended by a naturopath or by a trained Bach flower practitioner after an interview.

The best known solution product is the Rescue Remedy combination, which contains an equal amount each of rock rose, impatiens, clematis, star of Bethlehem and cherry plum remedies. Rescue Remedy is a trademark and other companies produce the same formula under other names, such as Five Flower Remedy. Rescue Cream contains the same remedies in a cream form, with the addition of crab apple.

Philosophy 
Bach believed that illness was the result of a conflict between the purposes of the soul and the personality's actions and outlook. This internal war, according to Bach, leads to negative moods and to "energy blocking", thought to cause a lack of "harmony", thus leading to physical diseases.

Bach derived his solutions intuitively and based on his perceived psychic connections to the plants, rather than using research based on scientific methods. If Bach felt a negative emotion, he would hold his hand over different plants, and if one alleviated the emotion, he would ascribe the power to heal that emotional problem to that plant. He imagined that early-morning sunlight passing through dew-drops on flower petals transferred the healing power of the flower onto the water, so he would collect the dew drops from the plants and preserve the dew with an equal amount of brandy to produce a mother tincture which would be further diluted before use. Later, he found that the amount of dew he could collect was not sufficient, so he would suspend flowers in spring water and allow the sun's rays to pass through them. If this was impractical because of lack of sunlight or other reasons, he wrote that the flowers may be boiled. The result of this process Bach termed the "mother tincture", which is then further diluted before sale or use.

Bach was satisfied with the method, because of its simplicity, and because it involved a process of combination of the four elements:

By the time of his death in 1936 at 50 years of age, Bach had created a system of 38 different flower remedies along with their corresponding theories of ailments.

See also 
 Alternative medicine
Herbal tonic
 List of ineffective cancer treatments
 Naturopathic medicine
 Quackery

References

External links 
 Skeptic's Dictionary on Bach Flower therapy

 
Energy therapies
Mind–body interventions
Pseudoscience
Homeopathy
Alternative medical systems